The time in Islamic Emirate of Afghanistan follows a single standard time offset of UTC+04:30 (four and a half hours ahead of Coordinated Universal Time), even though the country spans almost two geographical time zones. 

The official national standard time is called called Afghanistan Time (AFT) internationally.

Daylight saving time

Afghanistan does not currently observe daylight saving time (also known as DST or summer time). 

The Afghanistan uses only one time zone across the whole nation and all its territories.

IANA time zone database

The territory of the Islamic Emirate of Afghanistan is covered in the IANA time zone database. The IANA time zone identifier for Afghanistan is Asia/Kabul. 

For Afghanistan, the tz database time zones contains one zone in the file zone.tab.

Columns marked with * are from the file zone.tab of the database.

See also 
 Time in Iran
 Time in Pakistan
 Time in Kyrgyzstan

References

 

ru:Афганистан#Время в Афганистане